Thomas Øverby (born 28 April 1976) is a retired Norwegian football defender.

He hails from Hernes. Playing for Elverum, he was scouted by Hamkam ahead of the 1995 season. From 2000 to mid-2002 he played for Skeid, and from mid-2002 to 2006 for Hønefoss. Ahead of the 2007 season he returned to Hamkam, before finishing his career in Nybergsund.

References

1976 births
Living people
People from Elverum
Norwegian footballers
Elverum Fotball players
Hamarkameratene players
Skeid Fotball players
Hønefoss BK players
Nybergsund IL players
Eliteserien players
Norwegian First Division players
Association football defenders
Sportspeople from Innlandet